The women's individual archery event at the 1980 Summer Olympics was part of the archery programme. The event consisted of a double FITA round. For each round, the archer shot 36 arrows at each of four distances—70, 60, 50, and 30 metres. The highest score for each arrow was 10 points, giving a possible maximum of 2880 points.

The gold medal went to Soviet Georgian Ketevan Losaberidze, the top Soviet archer of the 1970s. Losaberidze also won World team titles in 1973 and 1981, a European individual title in 1972 and European team titles in 1972, 1978 and 1980. The silver medal in Moscow went to her teammate, Natalya Butuzova, later the 1981 World Champion, and winner of the European Championship in 1980 and 1982.

Results

References

External links
Official Olympic Report

W
1980 in women's archery
Women's events at the 1980 Summer Olympics